Lucas Javier Victoriano Acosta (born November 5, 1977 in Tucumán) is a former Argentine-Spanish professional basketball player.

Professional career 
In his pro career, Victoriano played in the Argentine League, the Spanish League, the Italian League, and the EuroLeague.

National team career
Victoriano was a member of the senior Argentine national basketball team. With Argentina, he played at the following tournaments: the 1999 South American Championship, where he won a silver medal, the 2001 South American Championship, where he won a gold medal, the 2001 FIBA Americas Championship, where he won a gold medal, the 2002 FIBA World Cup, where he won a silver medal, and the 2003 FIBA Americas Championship, where he won a silver medal

Honours

Pro clubs
Italian 2nd Division Champion: (1)
2006

Argentine national team
1999 South American Championship: 
2001 South American Championship: 
2001 FIBA Americas Championship: 
2002 FIBA World Cup: 
2003 FIBA Americas Championship:

External links
Euroleague.net Profile
FIBA Profile (archive)
LatinBasket.com Profile
Italian League Profile 
Spanish League Profile 

1977 births
Living people
2002 FIBA World Championship players
Argentine expatriate basketball people in Spain
Argentine men's basketball players
Argentine people of Spanish descent
Basket Zaragoza players
Basketball players at the 1999 Pan American Games
CB Girona players
Club San Martín de Corrientes basketball players
Olimpia de Venado Tuerto basketball players
Lanús basketball players
Liga ACB players
Montecatiniterme Basketball players
Point guards
Real Madrid Baloncesto players
Scafati Basket players
Spanish men's basketball players
Pan American Games competitors for Argentina
Sportspeople from San Miguel de Tucumán